Harborne Academy (formerly Harborne Hill School) is a co-educational secondary school in the Harborne area of Birmingham, in the West Midlands of England.

Previously a community school administered by Birmingham City Council, Harborne Hill School converted to academy status in September 2010 and was renamed Harborne Academy. However the school continues to coordinate with Birmingham City Council for admissions. The school is now sponsored by Birmingham Metropolitan College, but continues to coordinate with Birmingham City Council for admissions. The school also has specialisms in science and health.

Harborne Academy offers GCSEs and BTECs as programmes of study for pupils.

History

The school became an academy in 2010. There was some difficulty finding a sponsor for it after Ark Schools pulled out, but it was eventually sponsored by Birmingham Metropolitan College.

Sixth form

The school previously had a sixth form.  This was re-opened in 2014. Inspection in 2016 found that "Teaching in the sixth form is better than in the rest of the school". In 2017 Ofsted reported that "The sixth form is a medical academy and specialises in helping students to gain the qualifications and skills needed to go on to a range of medical professions". As of 2023, the school no longer has a sixth form.

Inspections by Ofsted

 2010, as Harborne Hill School, Satisfactory
 2013, Requires Improvement
 2014, Requires Improvement
 2016, Inadequate
 2017, Good
 2022, Good. As of 2023, this is the school's most recent inspection.

Notable former pupils
Paul Uppal,  Conservative Party politician

References

External links
 

Secondary schools in Birmingham, West Midlands
Academies in Birmingham, West Midlands
Harborne